Just for Us is the second studio album by American band Francis and the Lights. It was released in December 2017 under KTTF Records.

Track listing

References

2017 albums
Francis and the Lights albums